Lev Rudolfovych Brovarskyi (30 November 1948, Drohobych – 4 June 2009, Lviv) was a Soviet football player and a Ukrainian coach.

Honours
 Soviet Cup winner: 1969

International career
Brovarskyi played his only game for USSR on 28 April 1971 in a friendly match against Bulgaria.

References
  Profile

1948 births
2009 deaths
People from Drohobych
Soviet footballers
Soviet Top League players
Soviet Union international footballers
Ukrainian footballers
Ukrainian football managers
Soviet football managers
Soviet expatriate football managers
FC Karpaty Lviv players
FC Dnipro players
Ukrainian Premier League managers
FC Karpaty Lviv managers
Association football midfielders
Recipients of the Honorary Diploma of the Cabinet of Ministers of Ukraine
Sportspeople from Lviv Oblast